The Girl from Chicago is a 1932 American Pre-Code drama film produced and directed by Oscar Micheaux, with an all-African-American cast including lead actors Grace Smith and Carl Mahon. The story concerns a federal agent who falls in love while on assignment in Mississippi. He helps his lover escape a local thug, and the film follows them to Harlem where they become involved in the assassination of a Cuban racketeer, played by Juano Hernández.

Produced on a shoestring budget, this independent production featuring a largely non-professional cast, is known as one of the better-quality Micheaux productions. As is common in Micheaux's films, the story line is padded with several musical numbers, offering a glimpse of African-American musical and dancing talent of the time.

Cast
Grace Smith
Carl Mahon
Eunice Brooks
Starr Calloway
Edwin Cary
Dorothy Van Engle

Preservation status
The film is preserved with a copy held in the Library of Congress collection.

DVD release
On May 26, 2009, a Region 0 DVD of the movie was released by Alpha Video.

References

External links
 
 
 The Girl from Chicago available for free download from Internet Archive

1932 films
African-American films
American black-and-white films
Race films
1932 crime drama films
Films directed by Oscar Micheaux
American crime drama films
1930s English-language films
1930s American films